Comer is Portuguese and Spanish for the verb to eat. It may also refer to:

Anjanette Comer (born 1939), American actress
Braxton Bragg Comer (1848-1927), American politician
Christine Comer, former Director of Science in the curriculum division of the Texas Education Agency (TEA)
Douglas Earl Comer, computer scientist, professor at Purdue University
Gary Comer (1927-2006), entrepreneur and founder of clothing retailer Lands' End
Hugh Comer (1842-1900), American businessman
J. W. Comer (1845-1919), American businessman
James Comer (politician) (born 1972), US Representative from Kentucky
James P. Comer, American professor of child psychiatry
Jodie Comer (born 1993), English actress
John Comer (1924-1984), English actor, best known for Last of the Summer Wine
Kevin Comer (born 1992), American baseball player
Samuel M. Comer (1893-1974), movie set decorator

Places
Comer, Georgia, United States, a city in Madison County

See also
 Franz Commer (1813-1887), German composer
 Commer, British commercial vehicle manufacturer active 1905–1979
 Commer, Mayenne, commune, France
 Comercial Mexicana, nicknamed "La Comer"
 Committee on Monetary and Economic Reform, Canada